Long Lake is a natural lake in South Dakota, in the United States.

Long Lake was descriptively named on account of the lake's relative long outline.

See also
List of lakes in South Dakota

References

Lakes of South Dakota
Bodies of water of Jerauld County, South Dakota